No. 628 Squadron RAF was a meteorological and air-sea rescue squadron of the Royal Air Force during the Second World War.

History
The squadron was formed at Red Hills Lake in Madras, India, on 21 March 1944, by redesignating 'B' Flight of No. 357 Squadron RAF. The unit was equipped with Consolidated Catalina Mks.Ib and Mk.IV flying boats, and operated as part of No. 225 Group RAF, Air Command, South East Asia. Although intended for special duties, the squadron spent most of its time with meteorological reconnaissance and ASR (air-sea rescue) flights over the Indian Ocean. It was disbanded at Red Hills Lake on 1 October 1944.

Aircraft operated

See also
 List of Royal Air Force aircraft squadrons

References
Notes

Bibliography

External links
 628 Squadron history on www.raf.mod.uk
 No. 628 Squadron RAF movement and equipment history
 History of No.'s 621–650 Squadrons at RAF Web

Aircraft squadrons of the Royal Air Force in World War II
Military units and formations established in 1944
Military units and formations disestablished in 1944